() is a rank used by the Russian Navy and a number of former communist states. Within NATO forces, the rank is rated as OR-8 and is equivalent to Warrant officer class 2 or Senior chief petty officer in English speaking navies.

Russia

While the rank  is etymologically borrowed from the English rank midshipman,  is a very senior and experienced enlisted rank, equivalent to a master chief petty officer or warrant officer, while midshipman is a cadet in training or a very junior officer rank, which, being an officer, is technically higher in rank than any enlisted rank, despite a midshipman's very junior status.

Imperial Russia

The rank was abolished in 1917 by the Bolsheviks.

Soviet Union and the Russian Federation
The rank was reintroduced in 1940.

The Russian Federation retained the rank structure of the Soviet Union in 1991.

Michman rank insignia

Insignia

See also
Comparative officer ranks of World War I
Ranks and rank insignia of the Soviet Army 1943–1955, and Ranks and rank insignia of the Soviet Armed Forces 1955–1991,
Ranks and rank insignia of the Russian Federation's armed forces 1994–2010
Naval ranks and insignia of the Russian Federation

References

Military ranks of Russia
Military ranks of the Soviet Union